The Diocese of Winona–Rochester is a Latin Church ecclesiastical territory or diocese of the Catholic Church in Southern Minnesota. The diocese's episcopal see is found in the Cathedral of the Sacred Heart in Winona, with the Co-Cathedral of St. John the Evangelist located in Rochester. The Diocese of Winona–Rochester is a suffragan diocese in the ecclesiastical province of the metropolitan Archdiocese of Saint Paul and Minneapolis.

Territory
The Diocese of Winona–Rochester has jurisdiction over 20 counties in Minnesota: Blue Earth, Cottonwood, Dodge, Faribault, Fillmore, Freeborn, Houston, Jackson, Martin, Mower, Murray, Nobles, Olmsted, Pipestone, Rock, Steele, Wabasha, Waseca, Watonwan, and Winona counties.

History

Pope Leo XIII erected the diocese on November 26, 1889. 
The episcopal see is located in the Cathedral of the Sacred Heart in Winona, Minnesota. It is bordered to the north by the Archdiocese of Saint Paul and Minneapolis, of which it is a suffragan see, and the Diocese of New Ulm. On March 27, 2018, the diocese announced that the Congregation for Bishops decided the diocese will be called the Diocese of Winona–Rochester. As part of this name change, St. John the Evangelist Church in Rochester was designated as co-cathedral.

Sex abuse cases and bankruptcy
In September 2018, the Minnesota Court of Appeals dismissed an appeal the diocese filed to block lawsuits for past cases of sex abuse. In November 2018, the Diocese of Winona–Rochester released a statement claiming that the diocese would file for Chapter 11 Bankruptcy due to the financial burden caused by the sex abuse lawsuits; it did so in December 2018. As part of its bankruptcy filing, the diocese agreed to not file an objection to having more plaintiffs added to the lawsuits so long as they could come forward by April 8, 2019.

Bishops
This is a list of the bishops who have served the diocese through its history.

Bishops of Winona
 Joseph Bernard Cotter (1889–1909)
 Patrick Richard Heffron (1910–1927)
 Francis Martin Kelly (1928–1949)
 Edward Aloysius Fitzgerald (1949–1969)
 Loras Joseph Watters (1969–1986)
 John George Vlazny (1987–1997), appointed Archbishop of Portland in Oregon
 Bernard Joseph Harrington (1998–2009)
 John M. Quinn (2009–2018), second see added in Rochester, name of diocese changed to Winona–Rochester

Bishops of Winona–Rochester
  John M. Quinn (2018–2022)
 Robert E. Barron (2022–)

Coadjutor bishops
 Leo Binz (1942–1949), did not succeed to see; appointed coadjutor archbishop and Archbishop of Dubuque and later Archbishop of Saint Paul and Minneapolis

Auxiliary bishops
 George Henry Speltz (1963–1966), appointed coadjutor bishop and later Bishop of Saint Cloud

Other priests of this diocese who became bishops
Robert Henry Brom, appointed Bishop of Duluth in 1983 and later Bishop of San Diego
Frederick William Freking, appointed Bishop of Salina in 1957 and later Bishop of La Crosse
Michael Joseph Hoeppner, appointed Bishop of Crookston in 2007
John Hubert Peschges, appointed Bishop of Crookston in 1938

Schools

Superintendents of schools

High schools
Cotter High School, Winona
Lourdes High School, Rochester
Loyola Catholic School, Mankato
Pacelli High School, Austin

Colleges
St. Mary's University of Minnesota

Seminaries
Immaculate Heart of Mary Seminary, Winona

Arms

See also

 Catholic Church by country
 Catholic Church in the United States
 Ecclesiastical Province of Saint Paul and Minneapolis
 Global organisation of the Catholic Church
 List of Roman Catholic archdioceses (by country and continent)
 List of Roman Catholic dioceses (alphabetical) (including archdioceses)
 List of Roman Catholic dioceses (structured view) (including archdioceses)
 List of the Catholic dioceses of the United States

References

External links
Roman Catholic Diocese of Winona–Rochester Official Site

 
Winona
Religious organizations established in 1889
Diocese of Winona
Winona County, Minnesota
Winona
Winona
1889 establishments in Minnesota
Companies that filed for Chapter 11 bankruptcy in 2018